was a monthly fashion magazine published in Tokyo by Tokuma Shoten. The magazine targets girls from early- to mid-teens. The magazine was known for its models (called LoveBerrina). Love Berry is often abbreviated LB.

History and profile
Love Berry was started in 2001. The magazine was usually published on the first of every month. On 5 December 2011, Love Berry announced on its blog that Meredith had discontinued the magazine.

Models

Current (Lovemo) 
Exclusive models as of December 2017.

 Koharu Itō (Fuwa Fuwa)
 Hina Hiratsuka (Fuwa Fuwa)
 Yuriya Kimura
 Kokoro Kurokawa
 Maria Makino (Morning Musume)
 Ruka Mishima (The World Standard)
 Riko Nakayama (Shiritsu Ebisu Chugaku)
 Yūno Ōhara
 Yui Oguri (AKB48)
 Rion Seki
 Miku Tanaka (HKT48)
 Nako Yabuki (HKT48)

Former (LoveBerrina) 
 Hau Dan (June 2009 – February 2011)

See also
 Pichi Lemon
 Nicola

References

External links
  

2001 establishments in Japan
2012 disestablishments in Japan
Defunct women's magazines published in Japan
Fashion magazines published in Japan
Magazines established in 2001
Magazines disestablished in 2012
Magazines published in Tokyo
Monthly magazines published in Japan
Teen magazines published in Japan
Women's fashion magazines